Men in the City (literally "Men's Hearts") is a 2009 German comedy film directed by Simon Verhoeven with Christian Ulmen, Nadja Uhl and Wotan Wilke Möhring.

Plot
Five men attend the same gym in Berlin. None of them seem to have anything in common, but all five have not enough confidence to meet or develop relationships with the opposite sex, and what it really means to be a man or what women expect of them. Günther Stobanski (Christian Ulmen) fails with Internet dating, music producer Jerome Ades (Til Schweiger) passes from a sentimental break-up story to another. Train driver Roland Feldberg (Wotan Wilke Möhring) snubs his wife Susanne Feldberg (Nadja Uhl). The girlfriend of Philip Henrion (Maxim Mehmet) becomes pregnant at a young age. Niklas Michalke (Florian David Fitz) is terrified by his impending marriage, while the singer Bruce Berger (Justus von Dohnányi) tries to pursue his singing career.

Cast

 Christian Ulmen as Günther Stobanski
 Wotan Wilke Möhring as Roland Feldberg, a railroad engineer
 Nadja Uhl as Susanne Feldberg, Roland's wife
 Til Schweiger as Jerome Ades, a music producer
 Maxim Mehmet as Philip Henrion
 Florian David Fitz as Niklas Michalke
 Jana Pallaske as Nina Hellmich
 Justus von Dohnányi as Bruce Berger, a singer
 Inez Bjørg David as Maria Hellström
 Liane Forestieri as Laura Sandner
 Fritz Karl as Martin
 Fahri Yardım as Loco
 Palina Rojinski as Sabrina Silver
 Birge Schade as Pflegerin Beate
 Carl Heinz Choynski as Vater Feldberg 
 Bastian Pastewka as Father
 Dennis Gansel as Lars

Themes

The main theme of the film is the search for love and happiness, and the fear of being alone, but love is a battlefield and it's worth fighting for the woman you love.

Production

Men in the city was financed by Medienboard Berlin-Brandenburg Gmbh Film and German Federal Film Board Film Financier, and filmed in Berlin, Germany.

Writing and production credits

 Simon Verhoeven – film director and screenwriter
 Jo Heim – director of photography
 Quirin Berg – film producer
 Max Wiedemann – film producer
 Stefan Essl – editor
 Silke Faber – costume designer
 Thomas Stammer – production designer
 Anja Dihrberg – casting
 Wiedemann & Berg Filmproduktion Gmbh & Co. kg – production company
 Warner Bros. Pictures Germany – film studio

Release

Men in the city was first released in Austria, Germany, and Switzerland on 8 October 2009. The film was screened on 23 October 2010 at the Berlin & Beyond Film Festival in San Francisco, United States.

Home media
The DVD release of the film was premiered on 2 December 2010 in Russia.

Film distributors
 Ster-Kinekor – theatrical distributor
 Warner Bros. Pictures International – foreign theatrical distributor
 Independent Distributors – foreign theatrical distributor
 Beta Film – theatrical distribution sales

Music and soundtrack 

The film score and the soundtrack album for Men in the City was produced by Simon Verhoeven and was released on 9 October 2009 through Universal Music.  Verhoeven wrote and recorded the album together with the lead singer of the band Marshmellow Club, Rufus Martin.  Simon Verhoeven and Wolfgang Hammerschmid were responsible for the film score's composition and orchestration that involved about twenty musicians.

The main theme song, "Wonderful", was written by British pop rock singer and songwriter Gary Go in January 2009 and released on 16 February 2009, as the first and debut single from his self-titled debut studio album. The single reached the Top 40 of the British, German and Austrian music charts. Its music video was filmed on a Berlin rooftop and includes scenes from the film. Go also contributed to the song "Berlin" with a reinterpretation of his song "Brooklyn", featured on his debut album. BRIT Award-winning English singer-songwriter and guitarist James Morrison wrote and composed the song "Watch and Wait".

Track listing

Charts

References

External links

 
 
 
 
 

Films directed by Simon Verhoeven
2009 films
2009 comedy films
German comedy films
2000s German-language films
Films set in Berlin
2000s German films